Manfred Stolpe (16 May 1936 – 29 December 2019) was Federal Minister of Transport, Building and Urban Affairs of Germany from 2002 until 2005. Before, he was Ministerpräsident of the state Brandenburg from 1990 until 2002. Stolpe was, after the state elections following German reunification, the only Social Democratic Minister-President of a state of former East Germany. Stolpe is thought of as the architect of modern Brandenburg and left office with a 74% approval rating. He is credited with forging a new identity for the state, among other things, popularizing the Brandenburglied, though controversy surrounding failed projects and his work for the Stasi came up during his tenure. To date, Brandenburg has only had Social Democratic Minister-Presidents.

Biography

Early life and education
Stolpe was born in Stettin (today Szczecin in Poland). He studied law at the University of Jena in German Democratic Republic (GDR) (1955–1959). In 1959 he became active in the Protestant Church in Berlin-Brandenburg, then comprising East Berlin and West Berlin and the region of Brandenburg, and was a guest student at the Free University of Berlin until 1961.

GDR career
Between 1962 and 1969 he was Head of the Secretariat of the Conference of Governing Bodies of the
Evangelical Churches in the GDR. After this he became Head of the Secretariat of the Federation of Evangelical Churches (GDR), a post which he held until 1981. During this time he was appointed to the World Council of Churches "Commission on International Relations".

In 1982 Stolpe became Consistorial President of the Eastern Region of the then divided Evangelical Church in Berlin-Brandenburg and, as such, a member of the Conference of Governing Bodies of the Evangelical Churches in the GDR; at the same time he was one of the two deputy chairmen of the Federation of Evangelical Churches. He gave up these positions in 1990 and 1989 respectively. He was a Stasi informer for 20 years while in the church.

Political career after reunification
In July 1990 he joined the Social Democratic Party of Germany (SPD) and on 14 October of that year he was elected to the Brandenburg Landtag for a riding in Cottbus. Shortly afterwards, on 1 November 1990, he was elected Ministerpräsident of the State of Brandenburg. He was re-elected twice, gaining an absolute majority of seats in the 1994 Brandenburg state election, even though he had been accused of collaborating with the Stasi, chiefly by then-Federal Commissioner for the Stasi Records Joachim Gauck. He held the position until his resignation on 26 June 2002. During his time in office, he spearheaded an unsuccessful attempt to unify Brandenburg and Berlin in 1996, though the states cooperate on many matters to this day. From May 1991 to 26 June 2002 he was a Member of the SPD National Executive.

From 22 October 2002 to November 2005, he was Federal Minister of Transport, Building and Urban Affairs.

Personal
He married Ingrid Stolpe, a physician (now retired) in 1961. The couple had one child. They both received treatment for cancer, a subject on which they wrote a book and spoke on television.

Awards
Stolpe received honorary Doctorates in Theology from the University of Greifswald (November 1989), from the University of Zurich (April 1991) and in Economics from the University of Szczecin (June 1996).

References

External links 
 
 

1936 births
2019 deaths
Politicians from Szczecin
German Lutherans
Social Democratic Party of Germany politicians
Transport ministers of Germany
Construction ministers of Germany
People from the Province of Pomerania
University of Jena alumni
Ministers-President of Brandenburg
Knights Commander of the Order of Merit of the Federal Republic of Germany
People of the Stasi
Recipients of the Medal of Merit of the GDR
Deaths from liver cancer
20th-century Lutherans